Mimille Olfaga de Borniche Okiélé (born 17 April 1988) is a Congolese former professional footballer who played as a defender.

Club career
Okielé was born in Lengo. In July 2007, he was transferred from CARA Brazzaville to AJ Auxerre B and in the 2008–09 season he was loaned out to AS Vitré.

International career
Okiélé was a part of the Congo U-20 national team which won the 2007 African Youth Championship. During the competition, he was one of the most attractive players. He also participated at the 2007 FIFA U-20 World Cup in Canada.

References

Living people
1988 births
Republic of the Congo footballers
Association football defenders
Republic of the Congo international footballers
Republic of the Congo youth international footballers
Championnat National 2 players
CARA Brazzaville players
AJ Auxerre players
AS Vitré players
Republic of the Congo expatriate footballers
Republic of the Congo expatriate sportspeople in France
Expatriate footballers in France